Richard Müller-Freienfels (1882–1949) was a German philosopher, psychologist and social critic. He was "one of the most important mediators of empirical psychology" to poetics.

Life
Müller-Freienfels was born in Bad Ems on 7 August 1882. He was a lecturer and writer at the Berlin Trade School (Handelsschule Berlin). He died on 12 December 1949 in Weilburg.

Works
 Psychologie der Kunst: eine Darstellung der Grundzüge, 1912
 Poetik [Poetics], 1914
 Persönlichkeit und weltanschauung: die psychologischen grundtypen in religion, kunst und philosophie, 1919
 Philosophie der individualität, 1921
 Psychologie des deutschen Menschen und seiner Kultur : ein volkscharakterologischer Versuch, 1922. Translated by Rolf Hoffmann as The German, his psychology and culture: an inquiry into folk character, 1936.
 Die Seele des Alltags : eine Psychologie für Jedermann, 1925.
 Geheimnisse der Seele, 1927. Translated by Bernard Miall as Mysteries of the Soul, 1929
 Die Hauptrichtungen der gegenwärtigen Psychologie, 1929. Translated by W. Béran Wolf as The evolution of modern psychology, 1935.

References

1882 births
1949 deaths
German psychologists
German sociologists
20th-century psychologists
20th-century German philosophers
Writers from Rhineland-Palatinate
People from Rhein-Lahn-Kreis